Alfonso Cuarón Orozco (born 28 November 1961) is a Mexican filmmaker. He is known for directing films in a variety of genres, including the family drama A Little Princess (1995), the romantic drama Great Expectations (1998), the coming of age road film Y tu mamá también (2001), the fantasy film Harry Potter and the Prisoner of Azkaban (2004), science fiction films such as Children of Men (2006) and Gravity (2013) and the semi-autobiographical drama Roma (2018).

Cuarón has received 11 Academy Award nominations, winning four: Best Director for Gravity and Roma, Best Film Editing for Gravity, and Best Cinematography for Roma. He is the first Mexican filmmaker to win the Best Director award, and the second person to have been nominated for an Academy Award in seven different categories after Kenneth Branagh.

Early life
Cuarón was born in Mexico City, the son of Alfredo Cuarón, a doctor specializing in nuclear medicine, and Cristina Orozco, a pharmaceutical biochemist. He has two brothers; Carlos, also a filmmaker, and Alfredo, a conservation biologist. Cuarón studied philosophy at the National Autonomous University of Mexico and filmmaking at the Centro Universitario de Estudios Cinematográficos, a school within the same university. There he met the director Carlos Marcovich and cinematographer Emmanuel Lubezki, and they made what would be his first short film, Vengeance Is Mine.

Career

1990s: Early career

Cuarón began working on television in Mexico, first as a technician and then as a director. His television work led to assignments as an assistant director for several film productions including La Gran Fiesta, Gaby: A True Story and Romero, and in 1991 he landed his first big-screen directorial assignment.

In 1991, Cuarón directed Sólo con tu pareja, a sex comedy about a womanizing businessman (played by Daniel Giménez Cacho) who, after having sex with an attractive nurse, is fooled into believing he's contracted AIDS. In addition to writing, producing and directing, Cuarón co-edited the film with Luis Patlán. The film, which also starred cabaret singer Astrid Hadad and model/actress Claudia Ramírez (with whom Cuarón was linked between 1989 and 1993) was a big hit in Mexico. After this success, director Sydney Pollack hired Cuarón to direct an episode of Fallen Angels, a series of neo-noir stories produced for the Showtime premium cable network in 1993; other directors who worked on the series included Steven Soderbergh, Jonathan Kaplan, Peter Bogdanovich, and Tom Hanks.

In 1995, Cuarón released his first feature film produced in the United States, A Little Princess, an adaptation of Frances Hodgson Burnett's classic novel. Cuarón's next feature was also a literary adaptation, a modernized version of Charles Dickens's Great Expectations starring Ethan Hawke, Gwyneth Paltrow, and Robert De Niro.

2000s: International success 

In 2001, Cuarón found himself returning to Mexico with a Spanish-speaking cast to film Y tu mamá también, starring Gael García Bernal, Diego Luna and Maribel Verdú. It was a provocative and controversial road comedy about two sexually obsessed teenagers who take an extended road trip with an attractive married woman who is much older than them. The film's open portrayal of sexuality and frequent rude humor, as well as the politically and socially relevant asides, made the film an international hit and a major success with critics. Cuarón shared an Academy Award nomination for Best Original Screenplay with co-writer and brother Carlos Cuarón.

In 2004, Cuarón directed the third film in the successful Harry Potter series, Harry Potter and the Prisoner of Azkaban. Cuarón faced criticism at the time from some Harry Potter fans for his approach to the film, notably its tendency to take more creative liberties with the source material than its predecessors. However, author J. K. Rowling, who had seen and loved Cuarón's film Y tu mamá también, said that it was her personal favorite from the series so far. Critically, the film was also better received than the first two installments, with some critics remarking its new tone and for being the first Harry Potter film to truly capture the essence of the novels. It has been subsequently rated by audience polls and critics as the best of the movie franchise series.

In 2006, Cuarón's feature Children of Men, an adaptation of the P. D. James novel starring Clive Owen, Julianne Moore, and Michael Caine, received wide critical acclaim including three Academy Award nominations. Cuarón himself received two nominations for his work on the film, in Best Film Editing (with Alex Rodríguez) and Best Adapted Screenplay (with several collaborators).

He created the production and distribution company Esperanto Filmoj ("Esperanto Films", named because of his support for the international language Esperanto), which has credits in the films Duck Season, Pan's Labyrinth, and Gravity.

Cuarón also directed the controversial public service announcement I Am Autism for Autism Speaks that was criticized by disability rights groups for its negative portrayal of autism.

2010s: Awards success

In 2010, Cuarón began to develop the film Gravity, a drama set in space. He was joined by producer David Heyman, with whom Cuarón worked on Harry Potter and the Prisoner of Azkaban. Starring Sandra Bullock and George Clooney, the film opened the 70th Venice International Film Festival in August. The film was then released in America in October 2013. The film became a financial success, earning 723.2 million at the box office against a budget of 130 million. The film also received many awards nominations. For the film, he received the Golden Globe Award in the category of Best Director. The film received ten Academy Award nominations, including Best Picture and Best Director. Cuarón won for Best Directing, becoming the first Latin American to win the award, while he and Mark Sanger received the award for Best Film Editing.

In 2013, Cuarón created Believe, a science fiction/fantasy/adventure series that was broadcast as part of the 2013–14 United States network television schedule on NBC as a mid-season entry. The series was created by Cuarón for Bad Robot Productions and Warner Bros. Television. In 2014, Time placed him in its list of "100 Most Influential People in the World" – Pioneers.

In May 2015, Cuarón was announced as the president of the jury for the 72nd Venice International Film Festival.

Production began in fall 2016 for Cuarón's eighth film, Roma, a tale of a housekeeper for a middle class Mexican family in 1970s Mexico City, based on the life of his family's longtime maid, Liboria Rodríguez. The project was produced by Cuarón, Gabriela Rodríguez and Nicolás Celis and starred Yalitza Aparicio and Marina de Tavira both of whom received Oscar nominations. The film debuted at the 75th Venice International Film Festival, where it won the Golden Lion, and was distributed to select Mexican and American theaters before its online release on Netflix. Roma was highly acclaimed upon release; among its accolades are two Golden Globes (Golden Globe Award for Best Foreign Language Film and Best Director for Cuarón) and three Academy Awards (Best Director, Best Foreign Language Film, and Best Cinematography for Cuarón) out of a leading ten nominations. In 2019, Cuaron signed an overall TV deal at Apple. His first series for Apple will be the psychological thriller Disclaimer, which is set to star Cate Blanchett and Kevin Kline.

Style 

Cuarón often uses long takes and moving cameras to emulate a documentary film style.

Personal life
Cuarón is a vegetarian and has been living in London since 2000.

Cuarón's first marriage was to Mariana Elizondo with whom he has a son, Jonás Cuarón, born in 1981. Jonás is also a film director, known for Year of the Nail and Desierto. Alfonso's second marriage, from 2001 to 2008 was to Italian actress and freelance journalist Annalisa Bugliani, with whom he has two children.

He has publicly shown his fascination for the Esperanto language and his support for the Esperanto movement. He called his production company Esperanto Filmoj.

Filmography

Awards and nominations

See also

 Esperanto Filmoj
 Cha Cha Cha Films
 Cinema of Mexico
 List of Academy Award records

References

External links

 
 Alfonso Cuarón: A Life in Pictures, BAFTA webcast, 27 July 2007

1961 births
Living people
Best Cinematographer Academy Award winners
Best Cinematography BAFTA Award winners
Best Directing Academy Award winners
Best Director AACTA International Award winners
Best Director BAFTA Award winners
Best Director Golden Globe winners
Best Film Editing Academy Award winners
Directors Guild of America Award winners
Directors of Best Foreign Language Film Academy Award winners
Directors of Golden Lion winners
English-language film directors
Fantasy film directors
Filmmakers who won the Best Film BAFTA Award
Filmmakers who won the Best Foreign Language Film BAFTA Award
Film directors from Mexico City
Hugo Award-winning writers
Mexican cinematographers
Mexican Esperantists
Mexican expatriates in the United Kingdom
Mexican film producers
Mexican filmmakers
Mexican people of Spanish descent
Mexican screenwriters
Mexican television directors
Mexican television producers
Mexican television writers
National Autonomous University of Mexico alumni
Nebula Award winners
Science fiction film directors
Spanish-language film directors
Writers from Mexico City